Quincy McDuffie (born September 24, 1990) is an American professional Canadian football wide receiver and return specialist who is currently a free agent. He was most recently a member of the Ottawa Redblacks of the Canadian Football League (CFL). He played college football for the UCF Knights of the University of Central Florida. He was named to the All-Conference USA first-team in 2010 and 2012. McDuffie has also been a member of the Denver Broncos, Hamilton Tiger-Cats, Winnipeg Blue Bombers and Dallas Cowboys.

High school
McDuffie played on the track and football teams at Edgewater High School. He ran a 46-second quarter-mile and was the district champion and regional champion in the 200 meters in track in 2008. He played defensive back and wide receiver in football.

College
McDuffie played on the UCF football team from 2009 to 2012. As a true freshman in 2009, he had 8 receptions for 126 yards, 11 rushes for 55 yards, and 39 kickoff returns for 944 yards. He had a 95-yard kickoff return for a touchdown in his first collegiate game.

The following year, McDuffie had 13 receptions for 144 yards, 10 rushes for 54 yards, and 27 kick returns for 869 yards. He had kickoff returns of 93 yards and 95 yards for touchdowns. He was a first-team All-Conference USA selection.

McDuffie had 43 receptions for 482 yards, 12 rushes for 132 yards, and 7 kickoff returns for 106 yards in 2011.

In 2012, McDuffie had 28 receptions for 350 yards, 19 rushes for 170 yards, and 17 kickoff returns for 582 yards. His 34.2 yard average on kick returns ranked first in the nation. In an October game against Marshall, McDuffie set a school and Conference USA record by returning two kickoffs for touchdowns – one 97 yards and the other 98 yards – in the same game. In November, he scored a touchdown on a 99-yard kickoff return against ECU. McDuffie was named Conference USA Special Teams Player of the Year and was a first-team All-Conference USA selection. He set school records for career kickoff returns, with 90; career kickoff return yards, with 2,501; and career kickoff return touchdowns, with 6.

Professional career

Denver Broncos 
McDuffie was signed as an undrafted free agent by the Denver Broncos on April 28, 2013. He was waived by the team on August 26, 2013, after suffering a hamstring injury.

Hamilton Tiger-Cats 
McDuffie was signed as a free agent by the Hamilton Tiger-Cats on May 27, 2014. In two seasons in Hamilton, McDuffie only played in two games, catching 2 passes for 8 yards.

Winnipeg Blue Bombers 
On January 22, 2016 McDuffie signed with the Winnipeg Blue Bombers. McDuffie played in 13 games for the Bombers in 2016, mostly playing as kick and punt return specialist.

Dallas Cowboys
On January 31, 2017, McDuffie signed a reserve/future contract with the Dallas Cowboys. He was waived on June 2, 2017.

Ottawa Redblacks 
On August 1, 2017, McDuffie signed a two-year contract with the Ottawa Redblacks. He was released by the Redblacks on April 3, 2018.

Personal
McDuffie was born in Orlando, Florida to Quincy Howard and Vonetta Burch. He has a younger brother, Alton Howard, who played receiver, running back and defensive back in his junior year at Edgewater High School and College ball for the Tennessee Volunteers. McDuffie is 5 feet, 10 inches tall and weighs 178 pounds. His major is general studies, with minors in coaching and hospitality management.

References

1990 births
Living people
UCF Knights football players
Players of American football from Orlando, Florida
Players of Canadian football from Orlando, Florida
American football wide receivers
American football return specialists
Canadian football wide receivers
American players of Canadian football
Hamilton Tiger-Cats players
Dallas Cowboys players
Ottawa Redblacks players
Denver Broncos players
Winnipeg Blue Bombers players
Edgewater High School alumni